Caroline Louise Beavan Johnson ( Symonds; born 17 March 1988) is a British media consultant and the wife of former Prime Minister of the United Kingdom Boris Johnson. She is the daughter of Matthew Symonds, co-founder of The Independent.

Symonds worked as a Conservative Party media official and an environmental activist, and remains a senior advisor to the ocean conservation charity Oceana, and is a patron of the Conservative Animal Welfare Foundation. She began an affair with Johnson, then Foreign Secretary, in 2018 while he was still married to his second wife, Marina Wheeler.

In July 2019, Johnson became prime minister and both he and Symonds officially moved into the flat above 11 Downing Street. She was the first unmarried partner of a prime minister to reside at Downing Street. On 29 February 2020, Symonds and Johnson announced that they had become engaged in late 2019. Symonds married Johnson in 2021.

Early life and education 
Caroline Louise Beavan Symonds was born on 17 March 1988 to Matthew Symonds, co-founder of The Independent, and Josephine McAfee (née Lawrence), a lawyer working for that newspaper. Her paternal grandfather was John Beavan, Baron Ardwick (at one time editor of the Daily Herald and later, during the 1970s, a Labour Party MEP), and her paternal grandmother was Anne Symonds, a BBC World Service journalist.

Symonds was the result of an affair between her parents, who were both married to other people at the time. She was brought up by her mother in East Sheen, South West London, and between 1999 and 2006 attended Godolphin and Latymer School, a private day school for girls. She went to the University of Warwick to study Art History and Theatre Studies, graduating as BA (Hons) in 2009.

Career and political activism 
Symonds originally planned to become an actor, and unsuccessfully auditioned for the 2007 film Atonement. She subsequently worked in marketing.

In 2009, Symonds joined the Conservative Party as a press officer. She worked at Conservative Campaign Headquarters, and later campaigned for Boris Johnson in the 2010 London Conservative Party mayoral selection. During this period, Symonds had a role running campaigns for the newly elected MP Zac Goldsmith. She has also worked as a media special adviser for Conservative Cabinet ministers Sajid Javid (Communities, Local Government and Housing Secretary) and John Whittingdale (Culture, Media and Sport Secretary). Symonds was present when Whittingdale and others launched Conservative Friends of Russia (later called the Westminster Russia Forum and disbanded in March 2022) and has attended several of its meetings.

Symonds became the Conservative Party's head of communications in 2018, but left the position later that year, taking up a job in public relations for the Oceana project. It was reported that she was asked to leave her post as director of communications, with Conservative Party sources in the Daily Mail newspaper claiming that the firing was due to poor performance and allegations of significant unjustified expenses claims. These accusations were claimed by an anonymous "longtime colleague" to be a smear campaign allegedly spread by Symonds's political strategist, Lynton Crosby (subsequently denied by Crosby).

She is a patron of the Conservative Animal Welfare Foundation.

John Worboys case 
In 2007, aged 19, Symonds was driven home from a King's Road nightclub by taxi-driver John Worboys, who in 2009 was convicted of multiple sexual assaults on his passengers. She later recalled Worboys offering her champagne and vodka, which she believed was spiked and, after returning home, began "vomiting and laughing hysterically before passing out until 3pm the next day".

Symonds was one of fourteen women who testified against Worboys at his trial. She subsequently told The Telegraph that he was "a sad, wicked man who is a danger to society. I feel so angry that he pleaded not guilty and made us go through the pain of giving evidence in court".

Symonds was the youngest of Worboys's victims, and waived her anonymity to talk about her experiences and, later, to campaign against his early release, fundraising for a successful judicial review of the decision.

Public and personal life 

Symonds was previously in a relationship with The Sun journalist Harry Cole.

She began an affair with British politician Boris Johnson, then Foreign Secretary, in 2018 while he was still married to his second wife, Marina Wheeler. In July 2019, Johnson became prime minister and both he and Symonds officially moved into the flat above 11 Downing Street. She was the first unmarried partner of a prime minister to reside at Downing Street. The following month, she was barred from entering the United States as her visa application was rejected due to a previous visit with her close friend Nimco Ali to Somaliland, which the US considers to be part of immigration-restricted Somalia. On 16 August 2019, she made her first public appearance since entering 10 Downing Street, when she addressed what she called the "gigantic" climate crisis.

On 29 February 2020, Symonds and Boris Johnson announced that they had become engaged in late 2019 and were expecting their first child together in early summer. Their son, Wilfred Lawrie Nicholas Johnson, was born on 29 April 2020 in London. She used to be a practising Catholic and had her son baptised into the Catholic Church.

Symonds married Boris Johnson on 29 May 2021 in a secret ceremony at Westminster Cathedral attended by thirty guests. She wore a boho-chic style bridal gown by Greek designer Christos Costarellos. In July 2021, she announced that they were expecting their second child together, also revealing that she had suffered a miscarriage earlier that year. Their daughter, Romy Iris Charlotte Johnson, was born on 9 December 2021 in London.

Amid the Partygate scandal, she was issued with a fixed penalty notice in April 2022 for breaching COVID-19 regulations. She apologised and paid the penalty.

Political influence 

Concerns over her influence on the prime minister were raised in January 2020, when it came to light that she had received briefs from animal rights activists just before the government pulled a planned cull of badgers in Derbyshire. An association representing farmers, the NFU, asserted that this meeting and her influence played a key role in the government ignoring scientific advice in favour of retaining the cull. According to The Guardian, a judicial review was granted permission to examine how the decision was reached. She was also influential in making sure that Lee Cain did not get a job as the prime minister's chief of staff, and urged Boris Johnson to fire environment secretary George Eustice from his role. She was additionally involved in a political controversy over the refurbishment of the 11 Downing Street flat, and her comments over the flat's decor being a "John Lewis furniture nightmare" (John Lewis typically being an aspirational, upper-middle-class shop) led to accusations of snobbery.

During Dominic Cummings's tenure as chief adviser, Cummings and Carrie Symonds were said to represent two separate factions influencing the prime minister. Cummings also said that the prime minister "cancel[led] an inquiry about a leak ... because it might implicate his girlfriend's friends"; Cummings accused Henry Newman, the senior adviser in Downing Street and ally of Carrie Symonds, of being a "chatty rat" who leaked plans for a second lockdown in October. Cummings later said in 2021 that Symonds acted "illegally" in awarding influential jobs to her friends, including press secretary Allegra Stratton.

Conservative MP Caroline Nokes asserted that Carrie Johnson's influence has been exaggerated for sexist purposes; she has been likened to both Lady Macbeth and Marie Antoinette ("Carrie Antoinette") by her critics. Writing in The Sunday Times, Marie Le Conte disagreed that such criticism is sexist. Journalist Sarah Vine, on the other hand, said that while it is easy to "blame the woman", the truth is "far more complicated", adding that Johnson's head did not deserve "to be on the block".

In December 2021, Politico Europe named her as one of the "disrupters" in its annual list of 28 people who will shape Europe in the year to come.

In February 2022, Carrie Johnson's spokeswoman denied that Johnson has influence over her husband amidst allegations from Tory peer Lord Ashcroft, who had written an unauthorised biography of her. Labour leader Keir Starmer said in relation to the book, "I approach politics on the basis that we should treat people with respect... Obviously, respect differences of opinion, but I do not go along with the idea that we should drag everybody into the gutter."

In June 2022, an article by Simon Walters appeared in The Times alleging that Boris Johnson recommended Carrie, who was then his mistress, as a candidate for a £100,000 per annum job as Chief-of-Staff in the Foreign Office while Johnson was Foreign Secretary. After senior aide Ben Gascoigne threatened to resign if she was appointed, the proposal was dropped. This story was removed from the paper after No. 10 intervened, although Walters says that he stands by the story.

References

External links

1988 births
Living people
People educated at Godolphin and Latymer School
Alumni of the University of Warwick
Boris Johnson family
Charters Symonds family
English conservationists
English Roman Catholics
English socialites
Climate activists
Socialites from London
Spouses of prime ministers of the United Kingdom
Conservative Party (UK) people